Vatroslav is a Croatian masculine given name. It derives from word for "fire" (vatra) and the Slavic language suffix -slav, meaning "glory" or "fame". The feminine version is Vatroslava.

People named Vatroslav
Vatroslav Jagić (1838–1923), Croatian linguist
Vatroslav Lichtenegger (1809–1885), Austrian-Croatian music educator
Vatroslav Lisinski (1819–1854), Croatian composer
Vatroslav Mihačić (born 1967), retired Croatian footballer
Vatroslav Mimica (1923–2020), Croatian film director
Vatroslav Petrinović (born 1959), retired Croatian footballer

See also
 Slavic names

Croatian masculine given names